Mark Stanton Curtis (born 1959) is a former member of the American Socialist Workers Party (SWP). Curtis was the subject of a defense campaign by the SWP after he was charged and convicted of sexually assaulting a 14-year-old girl in 1988. The SWP and others of Curtis's defenders claimed that he had been framed by the police due to his politics and his trade union activities.  Curtis was paroled in 1996 after serving eight years of a 25-year sentence in Iowa State Penitentiary.

The SWP claimed that Curtis was arrested, beaten by the police and framed up for his work in organizing a campaign to defend 17 of his co-workers from Central America who had been seized in an INS raid of the Des Moines meatpacking plant at which they worked. Two police officers who arrested Curtis were found guilty of battery in 1992 and ordered to pay $11,000 in damages.

Curtis claimed that he was stopped at a traffic light in Des Moines when a woman approached him, said she was being followed and asked for a ride home. He claims that on arriving at her house he accompanied her to the porch at which point police came from behind, handcuffed him and pulled down his trousers.  
        
The 15-year-old girl, Demetria Morris, said she and her 11-year-old brother were watching television when Curtis knocked on their door asking for directions. According to the girl, Curtis then asked her if her parents were home, she said they were not, and he attacked her and attempted to rape her. Unbeknownst to Curtis, however, her brother had called the police who arrived on the scene.

The Morris family was awarded $80,000 in damages after suing Curtis.

Subsequent events undermined Curtis's defense: His expulsion from the SWP in 1999, and the SWP's cover-up of a rape committed by another member of the Des Moines SWP in 1995.

References

Books
Jayko, Margaret. The Frame-Up of Mark Curtis: A Packinghouse Worker's Fight for Justice. Pathfinder, 1989. 
McLaughlin, Martin. The Mark Curtis Hoax: How the Socialist Workers Party Tried to Dupe the Labor Movement. Mehring, 1990. 
Gaige, John. The Stakes in the Worldwide Political Campaign to Defend Mark Curtis. Mark Curtis Defense Committee, 1991.
Crane, Naomi. Why Is Mark Curtis Still in Prison?: The Political Frame-Up of a Unionist and Socialist and the Campaign to Free Him. Pathfinder, 1995. 
Crane, Naomi. A Packinghouse Worker's Fight for Justice: The Mark Curtis Story. Pathfinder, 1996.

External links
Curtis: `Glad To Return To The Class Struggle' , September 2, 1996 in "The Militant".

Living people
Members of the Socialist Workers Party (United States)
American trade union leaders
American people convicted of child sexual abuse
1959 births